The Years of Decay is the fourth studio album by thrash metal band Overkill, released on October 13, 1989 through Atlantic and Megaforce Records. It is the last Overkill album to feature guitarist Bobby Gustafson, who either left or was fired by the band amid a feud between himself and its founding members Bobby "Blitz" Ellsworth (vocalist) and D. D. Verni (bassist). The Years of Decay was also the first of two Overkill albums produced by Terry Date, who took on the same role for their follow-up album Horrorscope (1991).

Production and musical style
Musically, The Years of Decay features Overkill's most progressive and diverse work compared to their previous albums. Ellsworth has cited Black Sabbath as being an influence on the band writing and recording longer pieces, specifically their longest track to date "Playing with Spiders/Skullkrusher". Gustafson has also acknowledged Terry Date's production of the album as an improvement from its predecessor, Under the Influence:

Touring and promotion
Overkill spent nearly eight months touring in support of The Years of Decay, starting in November 1989 with a headlining U.S. trek supported by Wolfsbane and Dark Angel. The band spent the first half of 1990 touring relentlessly to support the album; it started with an East Coast tour supported by Powermad and Mordred, who also supported Overkill on the European leg of the tour. The band toured the U.S. in March and April 1990 with Vio-lence and Excel, followed by three shows in Japan in May and another U.S. tour the following month.

To date, all songs from The Years of Decay have been played live except "Nothing to Die For". According to frontman Bobby "Blitz" Ellsworth, "E.vil N.ever D.ies" is a continuation of the self-titled "Overkill" series of songs from the band's three previous albums, but was not named "Overkill IV"; this would be the last song of the series until Immortalis (2007), which features the most recent part in "Overkill V... The Brand".

Reception and legacy

Jason Anderson at AllMusic gave The Years of Decay a positive review, awarding it four stars out of five. He called it a "classic by the group's fans", and that it "is often mentioned as the pinnacle of the East Coast thrashers' recording career". The album reached No. 155 on the U.S. Billboard 200 and remained on that chart for eight weeks, making it Overkill's fourth highest-charting release to date. By May 2000 it had sold over 67,000 copies in the U.S., according to Nielsen SoundScan. Although the album's only single "Elimination" never appeared on the charts, its music video received regular rotation on MTV's Headbangers Ball, and the song remains a staple in Overkill's live repertoire.

In August 2014, Revolver magazine placed the album on its list of "14 Thrash Albums You Need to Own". It was also ranked fifth on Loudwires top ten list of "Thrash Albums NOT Released by the Big 4".

The Years of Decay has been seen as a major influence and inspiration to the groove metal scene that emerged in the early 1990s. Pantera had reportedly hired Terry Date to produce Cowboys from Hell based on his production of this album as well as Bobby Gustafson's guitar tone, which had influenced Dimebag Darrell and the band's transition away from glam to thrash/groove metal.

Track listing

Personnel
Bobby "Blitz" Ellsworth – lead vocals
D.D. Verni – bass
Bobby Gustafson – guitars
Sid Falck – drumsAdditional personnel'
Overkill – production
The Satones – backing vocals
Terry Date – engineering, production
Matt Lane – engineering
Howie Weinberg – mastering
Jon Zazula, Marsha Zazula – executive production
Steve Fastner, Rich Larson – cover illustration

Charts

References

Overkill (band) albums
1989 albums
Atlantic Records albums
Megaforce Records albums
Albums produced by Terry Date